The Dark Eye: Memoria (also known as Memoria) is a 2013 German point-and-click adventure game, developed and published by Daedalic Entertainment. The game is part of the video game series based on The Dark Eye, and is a direct sequel to Chains of Satinav. The game's story takes place after the events of the previous game, and focus upon Geron's quest to find a way to help his fairy Nuri recover, only to become caught in trying to unravel the mystery behind the disappearance of a heroic princess called Sadja and the quest she undertook. Following its release, the game received favourable reviews. The game was released for Windows and OS X on 30 August 2013. The game was released for Nintendo Switch, PlayStation 4, and Xbox One on 27 January 2021.

Gameplay
The player views the character on screen as if the player were standing and observing. The player is able to direct the character's actions by clicking on objects in the area. The character interact with the object, usually including dialogue that lets the player know if this action will help them to move forward in the game. The game progresses in a linear fashion with a prologue and eight distinct chapters.

Plot
In The Dark Eye: Memoria, the plot is divided into a story within a story structure. In the present time we follow once again bird catcher Geron where he tries to restore his lover Nuri, a forest fairy, who turned into a raven at the conclusion of the previous game. He meets a merchant named Fahi at the beginning of the game who promises Geron that he has the power to restore Nuri back to her humanoid form; all Geron has to do is to solve the fate of an ancient story about the heroic princess Sadja from the exotic land of Fasar, whom everybody has forgotten during the past 450 years.

Characters
The main characters are:

Geron's time
 Geron: The protagonist from the previous game, Geron is a birdcatcher with some magical ability. His goal is to restore the fairy Nuri to her original form.
 Nuri: Geron's love interest from the previous game, Nuri is a fairy who has been transformed into a raven. She is slowly losing her memories of her previous life.
 Fahi: A Tulamede merchant, Fahi is the secret companion to Halef, who protects him from mobs in return for services. Fahi promises to transform Nuri back into a fairy if Geron can help him solve a riddle. Fahi's ability to see into the past of objects provides the key to the story's resolution.
 Bryda: An apprentice mage who assists Geron in his attempts to solve the riddle.
 Owlric: An elderly mage.

Sadja's time
 Sadja: A young woman living 450 years before Geron's time, Sadja is determined to make a name for herself and leave a great legacy of her exploits. She seeks out the fortress of Drakonia, where she hopes to join the battle against demon hordes of Nether Hells.
 Halef (Staff): A former servant of Malakkar, Halef was transformed into a magic staff as punishment by his master. He is discovered by Sadja and forms a strong bond with her during her quest to Drakonia. After Sadja's disappearance, Halef waited for centuries to accumulate enough magic to create a body for himself and seek out the truth of her fate.
 Rachwan: A tribal outcast that acts as guide to Sadja but repeatedly betrays her.
 Prince Kasim: An arrogant prince who attempts to unlock the secrets of the Djinn of Time to create a kingdom bound to his rule.

Reception

Domestic press

Eurogamer.de praised the game, calling it "...what Daedalic was striving for all these years: A fantastical, but at the same time mature, Adventure, well thought-out and a personal experience through and through.". While Game Star praised the title's visual design and style calling it an "...atmospherically dense adventure impresses with its beautifully drawn and lovingly detailed game world."

International reviews
The game received generally favourable reviews achieving an average Metascore of 79 out of 100 based on 43 critic reviews. Ryan Bates at Game Revolution was critical of the games puzzles stating "The puzzles don’t always make sense in Memoria to the point that it repeatedly made me quit in frustration."

Sales
By 2016, Memoria was Daedalic's second-highest-grossing game behind The Dark Eye: Blackguards. The company's Carsten Fichtelmann attributed this success to "a high rate of full price sales", compared to the greater sales quantity but lower revenue of the Deponia series.

References

External links
 (archived)

2013 video games
Adventure games
Daedalic Entertainment games
Fantasy video games
MacOS games
Nintendo Switch games
PlayStation 4 games
Point-and-click adventure games
Video game sequels
Video games based on tabletop role-playing games
Video games developed in Germany
Video games featuring female protagonists
Windows games
Xbox One games